Elias Oubella (born 24 May 2001) is a German professional footballer who plays as a defender.

Club career
Oubella was a youth product of 1. FC Köln since 2013, and moved to Heracles Almelo on 10 May 2020. He made his professional debut with Heracles Almelo in a 3–0 KNVB Cup win over SC Telstar on 28 October 2020.

International career
Born in the Neuss, Germany, Oubella is of Moroccan descent. He is a youth international for Germany.

References

External links
 
 

2001 births
Sportspeople from Neuss
Footballers from North Rhine-Westphalia
Living people
German footballers
Germany youth international footballers
German people of Moroccan descent
Association football defenders
1. FC Köln II players
Heracles Almelo players
Regionalliga players
German expatriate footballers
German expatriates in the Netherlands
Expatriate footballers in the Netherlands
21st-century German people